Tana Chanabut (born June 6, 1984), simply known as Man is Thai professional football manager and former football player who is the head coach of Samut Prakan City F.C..

Club career
Tana has also played for Thailand Premier League side Provincial Electricity Authority FC and Coke's rivals Chonburi FC whom he played on loan at for the second half of the Thailand Premier League 2008 season, when Chonburi themselves came runners up.

He moved back to Coke at the end of the 2008 league campaign.

International career
On 8 September 2015, he played for Thailand in the 2018 FIFA World Cup qualification (AFC) against Iraq.

Coaching career
Tana started his coaching as a player-coach role when he was at Khon Kaen United. In June 2021, Tana was appointed as a manager for the first time for Ubon Kruanapat. However, he was sacked on 7 November 2021 after his team lost on 4 consecutive games. In December 2021, he joined Muang Loei United as a player-coach role for the second time.

Style of play
Tana is known for his speed and acceleration.

International

International goals

Managerial statistics

Honours

Club
 Thailand Tobacco Monopoly
 Thai Premier League (1): 2004-05

Police United
 Thai Division 1 League (1): 2015

International
Thailand
 King's Cup (1): 2016
Thailand U-23
 Sea Games  Gold Medal (2); 2003, 2007

Individual
 Thai Division 1 League Top Scorer (1): 2015

References

External links

1984 births
Living people
Tana Chanabut
Tana Chanabut
Association football forwards
Tana Chanabut
Tana Chanabut
Tana Chanabut
Tana Chanabut
Tana Chanabut
Tana Chanabut
Tana Chanabut
Tana Chanabut
Tana Chanabut
Tana Chanabut
Footballers at the 2006 Asian Games
Southeast Asian Games medalists in football
Tana Chanabut
Competitors at the 2003 Southeast Asian Games
Competitors at the 2007 Southeast Asian Games
Tana Chanabut